Lo Man-kam (born 1933) is a Hong Kong teacher of the martial art of Wing Chun.

Early life
Lo was born in 1933 in Hong Kong. During the Qing dynasty in Guangdong, Foshan, members of the Lo (Lu) family were government officials, as were many of their ancestors in many generations.  Thus, the Lo family lived in the housing provided to government officials which were guarded by the Qing Green Standard Army. The lobby of this Lo family residence has pair of royal plaques bestowed by Emperor of the Qing dynasty.

During the two major wars in China (the First and Second Sino-Japanese Wars), everything was destroyed. Owing to this, Lo family members temporarily stayed with the younger brother of Yip Man, Yip Ten, in his large mansion in Mulberry Garden. After the war, the Lo family moved back to Hong Kong.

Study under Yip Man in Hong Kong 
After Ip Man moved back to Hong Kong in 1949, he taught Wing Chun in the office of the Kowloon Hotel Union. It was at that time that Lo Man-kam started to learn from his uncle Yip Man. When Lo first started to learn Wing Chun in Hong Kong, there were only 5-7 students of Yip Man, including senior disciple Leung Sheung, Lok Yiu, Chu Shong-tin, Chan Kau, and little brother Yip (who was 13 years old at the time).

Life and career in Taiwan 

Lo was encouraged by Yip Man to teach in Taiwan before he moved to Taiwan in the 1960s. When Lo first moved to Taiwan, he underwent special military academy training. After graduation, Lo was appointed to work at the Ministry of National Defense in Taiwan. In 1975, he retired as a Major and opened his Wing Chun Kung Fu school in Neihu, Taipei, Taiwan. Immediately after opening the school, he had students named Daniel Duby (from Reunion) and James (from Madagascar). These students were the first foreign disciples to participate in the "Bai Si Lai" (Ceremony to honor the Sifu and to be accepted as an official disciple) in the Taiwanese wushu community.

In 1990, due to a speech given by Lo, the Taiwan Special Police Force First Corps leader Dr. Lu, who recognized the value of Lo's talent, appointed him to be a Taiwan Special Police Force instructor.

In 1992, when the Republic of China-Taiwan started its first SWAT team, Lo was appointed to be the first SWAT team head instructor.

In 1993, Dr. Lu from the Special Police Force got promoted to the principal of the Taiwan Police College. Lo then joined him at the Police College and continued teach and train future police officers and training instructors. Lo also helped the Police College by authoring the text book “Police Kung Fu”, which focuses on hand-to-hand combat techniques. This book has been translated to English and sold in the US and later translated to Russian as well.

At this time, director of Taiwan National Security Bureau had appointed Lo to teach Taiwan CIA hand-to-hand combat training, and also to write Bureau of Investigation teaching materials. Lo worked as training instructor for the Taiwan National Security Bureau 10 years. Lo also helped the Taiwan Judicial Yuan (Department) by authoring material for the Judicial police hand book and other training material, as well as serving as Taiwan Judicial Yuan training instructor.

Lo's position at the Police College, beginning with the term of Principle Dr. Lu, and continuing through the term of 5 other principals, lasted 18 years. Every now and then, he is invited back to give special training lessons.

Students and legacy 

In terms of family legacy of Wing Chun Kung Fu, Lo's son Gorden Lu, has been teaching Wing Chun in Virginia Beach in the United States for more than 10 years.

Students of Lo from many parts of the world such as Europe, New Zealand, Australia, the US and many other countries have come all the way to Taiwan to enter the door of the Lo Man-kam Wing Chun Kung Fu family.

Many of Lo's students have themselves become Sifu, and are teaching the 3rd generation of students in the Lo Man-kam lineage.  The Lo Man-kam Wing Chun Kung Fu Federation has students and schools in more than 40 countries, in Europe, North and South America, Asia, Africa and Australia.

Also Lo lead the Federation in Taiwan and created many Associations in other countries. The European countries and their Associations found the European Association as their common leadership.  Lo son Gorden Lu is the president and Los long time student Marc Debus is vicepresident of that organisation.

References
Police Kung Fu: The Personal Combat Handbook of the Taiwan National Police book written by Lo Man-kam Publisher: Tuttle Publishing; Original edition (November 1, 2001)Language: English  
Siu Lim Tao - The little idea book written by Marc Debus Publisher: Schreibstark-Verlag; Second edition (August 17, 2017)Language: English  
Cham Kiu - Seeking the bridge book written by Marc Debus Publisher: Schreibstark-Verlag; Second edition (August 17, 2017)Language: English  
Biu Tze - The third form of the Lo Man-kam Wing Chun System book written by Marc Debus Publisher: Schreibstark-Verlag; Second edition (June 28, 2017)Language: English  
The Lo Man-kam Wing Chun System: Stories, Reports and Techniques book written by Marc Debus Publisher: Schreibstark-Verlag; Second edition (March 11, 2018)Language: English  
Good Kung Fu - Meeting Wing Chun Master Lo Man-kam by Lucas Wiltse 2010/09/08 on TaipeiTravel.net under City News Taipei official Travel website
CTiTv news 中天電視 in Taiwan TV news station about  
CTiTv news 中天電視 in Taiwan TV news station about 正宗詠春拳！葉問外甥台灣授課 translate: real Wing Chun/ Ip Man nephew teaches in Taiwan 
Compte-rendu du stage de Wing Chun avec sifu Lo Man-kam article in Frech by Gilles 
 on the MDR Central German Broadcasting 2013 
 article of My training with Sifu Lo Man-kam by Marc Debus on Lo Man-kam German Association
article about Wing Chun Lineage 
Wing Chun Kung Fu master visits Peninsula from Taiwan" byBy Isabelle Khurshudyan on Daily Press Virginia Newspaper June 9, 2012 
 article Wing Chun Wisdom from Lo Man-kam by Bradley Temple on Articlecity.com
 article  A Chronicle of the Life of Ip (Yip) ManBy Ip (Yip) ChunTranslated by Master Samual Kwok
 article Historique sifu LO MAN-KAM in Belgium
 Yip Man on International Wing Chun organization
Traditional Ving Tsun Association family tree
 Wing Chun: Kung Fu Philosophy by Marco Lee on City Weekend Page from Beijing China

External links
- Official website for certified representatives of Lo Man-kam
Lo Man-kam Wing Chun Kung Fu Federation Facebook Fans Page
- Official US/English website for certified representatives of Lo Man-kam
- Official German website for representatives of Lo Man-kam
Interview with Lo Man-kam article by Will Mounger on Wing Chun Island May 30, 2010
Lo Man-kam Wing Chun In Taiwan Taiwan TV interview of Lo Man-kam 
Wing Chun Pedia has mention Lo Man-kam in Yip Man students list
(Wayback Machine copy)

1933 births
Living people
Wing Chun practitioners from Hong Kong